Gábor Vida (4 October 1929 – 19 February 2022) was a Hungarian figure skater. He competed in the pairs event at the 1952 Winter Olympics. Vida died on 19 February 2022, at the age of 92.

References

External links
 

1929 births
2022 deaths
Hungarian male pair skaters
Olympic figure skaters of Hungary
Figure skaters at the 1952 Winter Olympics
Figure skaters from Budapest